Korg M3 is a music workstation synthesizer  manufactured by Korg Corporation and introduced at the Winter NAMM show during January, 2007, being released four months later. The M3 is the successor of the famous Triton series. The name is based on the former M1, which was considered a revolutionary synth at the time.

The hardware synthesizer chip was designed around the HD-1, one of the various engines in the Korg OASYS. The M3 was named keyboard of the year at the Musik Messe Awards in Germany on early 2007.

Firmware
At the end of Q3 2008, Korg released a major update to the M3's operating system, which changes the unit to the 'M3 XPanded'. This update refines many of the functions of the M3, makes minor changes to the graphic user interface, adds four additional PCM sample libraries including a grand piano (EX-USB-PCM03) library, two brass and woodwind libraries (EX-USB-PCM01 & EX-USB-PCM02), a stereo grand piano (EX-USB-PCM04) library, and updates the KARMA to version 2.2 Kay Algorithmic Realtime Music Architecture developed by Stephen Kay (see: Korg KARMA).

Korg Komponent System
Korg Komponent System is a unique modular keyboard system devised by Korg that allows the keyboardist to configure their M3 in a multitude of ways. With three different keyboard options Korg explains the system like this: The 61-key model lets you mount a RADIAS-R analog modeling synthesizer instead of the M3-M sound generator, the 73-key model lets you mount the M3-M together with a RADIAS-R analog modeling synthesizer, and the 88-key model supports the combination of M3-M and RADIAS-R or even mounting two M3-M units simultaneously. Of course you can detach the M3-M sound generator and use it as a sound module, giving you great flexibility for constructing the system you need whenever you want.
The largest criticisms of the Komponent system are: 
 Korg seems to have abandoned the idea as only 2 modules (M3 and Radias) were Komponent compatible. 
 Korg will not sell the keybeds separately.  If you bought the M3 as a module, you cannot buy a 61, 73, or 88 key keybed except for on the used market.  Korg has released keyboards since the M3 and none take advantage of the Komponent system.

Korg M50

In 2008, Korg unveiled a new, stripped-down version of the M3: the Korg M50. It runs on the same EDS sound system as the M3, but it has less polyphony, no support for expansion cards, and no sampling capabilities. The Korg M50 also lacks a Karma engine, but it can still be used if bought separately and installed on a computer. The 88-key version, which featured the RH3 graded hammer-action piano keys, is the lightest 88-key keyboard Korg has ever made.

Notable Users
Juan Atkins
Mike Banks
Organized Noize
Derek Sherinian
Ed Wynne
Greg Phillinganes 
John Paul Jones
Chris Lowe
Spike Edney
Noah Lennox
Vadim Pruzhanov
Anthony Gonzalez of M83
Avey Tare
Vangelis/Evangelos Odysseas Papathanassiou

See also
 Korg Kronos
 Korg Trinity
 Korg Triton
 Korg Karma
 Korg RADIAS
 Alesis Fusion
 Roland Fantom-X
 Roland Juno-G
 Sampler (musical instrument)

References

Korg Corporation, Accessed on 24 December 2008 <https://web.archive.org/web/20071004065044/http://www.korg.com/gear/prod_info.asp?a_prod_no=M3&category_id=1>

External links
Korg Website
Karma-Lab Website - M3 page
Karma-Lab Wiki - M3 articles
Karma-Lab M3 Video and Audio clips
Korg Forums Website
Karma-Lab M3 forums
Free Korg M3 Trance & Electronic Combi's
Korg M3 Xpanded Sound On Sound review (archive.org)

M3
Music workstations